Football at the 2007 Island Games may refer to:

 Football at the 2007 Island Games – Men's tournament
 Football at the 2007 Island Games – Women's tournament

 
2007 Island Games
2007 in association football
2007